"Down on Me" is a traditional freedom song from the 1920s or earlier that became popular following its remake by Janis Joplin and Big Brother and the Holding Company.

Original version
Several early recordings and field recordings exist:
Eddie Head and His Family, (1930) on American Primitive Vol 1: Raw Pre-war Gospel (Revenant 206)
Mary Pickney and Janie Hunter, on Been in the Storm So Long: A Collection of Spirituals, Folk Tales and Children's Games from Johns Island, SC (Smithsonian Folkways 40031)
Doc Reed, Livingston, Alabama in 1940. on Negro Religious Songs and Services (Rounder CD 1514).
The Golden Harps, on compilation Soul of Chicago 
Edna G. Cooke
The lyrics of the freedom song are darker than the later Joplin lyrics. For example, the second stanza of jazz versions and Dock Reed's version run:

Janis Joplin version
Janis Joplin rearranged the song and created new lyrics. The song was originally released in the summer of 1967 and was featured on the band's debut album Big Brother & the Holding Company. The song would reach #42 on the charts, barely missing the Top 40 mark. A live, more aggressive version is featured on the posthumously released live album In Concert and the 1973 collection Janis Joplin's Greatest Hits. This version was also released as a single, reaching #91 on the charts in 1972.

The third and final stanza of Joplin's version ends with a positive message:

Joplin's version was covered by Jeany Reynolds in 1970.

References

1920s songs
1967 singles
Year of song unknown
Protest songs
Janis Joplin songs
Songwriter unknown